Quero may refer to:

People
 Diego Arias Quero (born 1999), Chilean football player
 Eduin Quero (born 1997), Venezuelan football player
 Félix Quero (born 1982), Spanish football player
 Juan Quero (born 1984), Spanish football player
 Manuel Cortés Quero (1906-1991), Spanish politician
 Manuel Quero Turillo (1554–1605), Roman Catholic prelate

Places
 Quero, Spain
 Quero, Veneto, Italy
 Quero Canton, Ecuador
 Quero Vas, Italy
 San José de Quero District, Peru

Other
 78652 Quero, a minor planet
 Querô, a 2007 Brazilian film
 Quero, a Brazilian company owned by Kraft Heinz

See also
 Kero (disambiguation)